Amisk Lake is a lake located in central Alberta about  northeast of the City of Edmonton and  east of the village of Boyle.

History
In the 1940s a Mink farm and resort with boat and cabin rentals were established on the northwest shore of the lake. Later it was replaced with two subdivisions and a trailer park which was built at the north end of the lake. However a majority of the shoreline remains undeveloped.

See also
Lakes of Alberta

References

Athabasca County
Lakes of Alberta
Oxbow lakes of Canada